Emel Sayın (born 20 November 1945) is a Turkish singer and actress.

Life
She was born in Şarkışla district of Sivas Province on 20 November 1945, to an Albanian father who immigrated from Skopje, and a mother from Mardin. Her parents moved frequently and she had to attend primary and secondary schools in various cities such as  Kayseri, Konya and Edirne. Finally she graduated from Teachers College of Çapa in Istanbul. However  by then, she had already chosen a career in music.

Emel Sayın married three times. Her first marriage was to İsmet Kasapoğlu in 1966. The couple divorced in 1975, but remarried a year later. Their marriage ended in 1979. From June 1979 to September 1981, she was married to Selçuk Aslan. Her third and final husband was David Younnes, whom she married in 1986 and divorced in 1999.

Music career
After serving three years in Istanbul Municipal Conservatory she got on the stage in 1962 in Ankara  while she was only 17. Next year she became a singer of Turkish Radio and Television Corporation (TRT) for seven years. She then moved to İstanbul to sing in the music halls. She also created music albums. Her genre was Turkish classical music
Later she began playing in the cinema and television films.

In 1998 she received the title state artist.

Before the Iranian Revolution (1978), she was present in Iranian cinema as an actress for a while, in addition to performing several live music.  She also performed the famous song Gole Sangam with Ava Bahram during a joint concert  in 2018 in Istanbul.

Discography 
Albums

 1970: Askin Kanunu
 1971: Sus Sus Sus
 1971: Gel Gel Gel
 1971: Doyamadım Sana
 1972: Son On Yılın En Sevilen On Şarkısı
 1975: Emel Sayın 73
 1975: Emel Sayın 74
 1975: Emel Sayın 75
 1975: Emel'in Dünyası
 1976: Emel Sayın 76
 1977: Emel Sayın (İran)
 1978: Sensiz Olmuyor
 1979: Rüzgar
 1980: Emel'in Seçtikleri
 1982: Bir Şarkıdır Yalnızlığım
 1985: Sevgiler Yağsın
 1986: Sevgisiz Yaşayamam
 1988: Sevdalılar
 1989: Kanımda Kıvılcım
 1990: Üzüldüğün Şeye Bak
 1991: İstanbul Şarkıları
 1992: Gücendim Sana
 1993: El Bebek Gül Bebek
 1997: Başroldeyim
 2000: Ah Bu Şarkılar 
 2000: Dinle 2001
 2006: Emel Sayın Münir Nurettin Söylüyor

Singles
 2009: "Haylazım"
 2011: "Mavi Boncuk"
 2013: "Hep Bana"

Acting career 
Sayın, who has appeared in various movies and TV series throughout her career, was given the "Lifetime Achievement Award" at the 53rd International Antalya Film Festival in 2016.

Filmography

References

External links

 

1945 births
Living people
Turkish women singers
People from Şarkışla
Turkish film actresses
Turkish people of Macedonian descent